Chinedu Sunday Chukwu (born 28 February 1997 in Nkanu East, Enugu State) is a Nigerian professional footballer who  plays as a centre back for Kano Pillars F.C. in the Nigerian Professional Football League. He alternatively plays as defensive midfielder.

Club career

Early career
Sunday Chukwu began his youth career with Abia Comets, where he played from 2013 to 2015.

Kwara United (2017–2018)
After an impressive two years at Abia Comets, In the 2017-2018 Nigerian Professional Football League season, he transferred to Kwara United of Ilorin, penning two-year contract with them where he played regularly during his debut season and made 23 match appearances with 5 goals.

Kano Pillars (2019–present)
On 1 January 2019 after rejecting many offers from clubs in the Nigerian Professional Football League, he signed with four times Nigerian Professional Football League champions Kano Pillars F.C. on a  two-year contract.

Career statistics

Club

Notes

References

External links 
  
 Profile on Flashscore.co.uk

1997 births
Living people
Nigerian footballers
Association football central defenders
Kwara United F.C. players
Kano Pillars F.C. players
Nigeria Professional Football League players
Footballers from Enugu State